Bradfield is a surname. Notable people with the surname include:

 Andrew Bradfield (1966–2001), New Zealand computer game programmer
 Arthur Bradfield (1892–1978), English cricketer
 Barry Bradfield (born 1981), Canadian artist
 Bill Bradfield (1910–2006), Australian aviation engineer and diplomat
 Cameron Bradfield (born 1987), American football player
 Carl Bradfield (born 1975), South African cricketer
 Damian Bradfield (born 1977), British businessman
 Frances Bradfield (1895–1967), British aeronautical engineer
 Geoffrey Bradfield (born 1948), South African cricketer
 Harold Bradfield (1898–1960), Anglican bishop
 Henry Joseph Steele Bradfield (1805–1852), British colonial official and author
 James Dean Bradfield (born 1969), lead singer of the band Manic Street Preachers
 Jim Bradfield (1933–1989), Australian politician
 John Bradfield (disambiguation), the name of a number of people
 John Bradfield (bishop) (died 1283), Bishop of Rochester
 John Bradfield (engineer) (1867–1943), designer of the Sydney Harbour Bridge
 Sir John Bradfield (scientist) (1925–2014), British founder of Cambridge Science Park
 John Ross Bradfield (1899–1983), businessman
 Ken Bradfield (born 1929), American yachtsman
 Mary Bradfield, Colorado politician
 Polly Bradfield, American improvisational violinist
 Roger Bradfield (1924–2021), children's book illustrator
 Scott Bradfield (born 1955), American essayist
 W. Louis Bradfield (1866–1919), English actor and singer
 William (Bill) Bradfield (1927–2014), Australian amateur astronomer and rocket scientist